Pacificulla flaviagra is a moth in the family Lecithoceridae. It was described by Kyu-Tek Park in 2013. It is found in Papua New Guinea.

References

External links
Portion of original description: Park, Kyu-Tek & Lee, Sangmi (2013). "Pacificulla gen. nov. of Lecithoceridae (Lepidoptera, Gelechioidea) from New Guinea, with descriptions of six new species". Zootaxa. 3599 (1): 67–77.

F
Moths of Papua New Guinea
Moths described in 2013